Ernst Ihbe (20 December 1913 – 30 August 1992) was a German cyclist. He won the gold medal in Men's tandem at the 1936 Summer Olympics.

References

1913 births
1992 deaths
German male cyclists
Olympic gold medalists for Germany
Cyclists at the 1936 Summer Olympics
Olympic cyclists of Germany
Olympic medalists in cycling
People from Altötting (district)
Sportspeople from Upper Bavaria
Cyclists from Bavaria
Medalists at the 1936 Summer Olympics
German track cyclists
20th-century German people